A half-metal is any substance that acts as a conductor to electrons of one spin orientation, but as an insulator or semiconductor to those of the opposite orientation. Although all half-metals are ferromagnetic (or ferrimagnetic), most ferromagnets are not half-metals. Many of the known examples of half-metals are oxides, sulfides, or Heusler alloys.

In half-metals, the valence band for one spin orientation is partially filled while there is a gap in the density of states for the other spin orientation. This results in conducting behavior for only electrons in the first spin orientation. In some half-metals, the majority spin channel is the conducting one while in others the minority channel is.

Half-metals were first described in 1983, as an explanation for the electrical properties of manganese-based Heusler alloys.

Some notable half-metals are chromium(IV) oxide, magnetite, and lanthanum strontium manganite (LSMO), as well as chromium arsenide. Half-metals have attracted some interest for their potential use in spintronics.

References

Further reading

 http://www-users.york.ac.uk/~ah566/research/half_metals.html
 http://www.tcd.ie/Physics/People/Michael.Coey/oxsen/newsletter/january98/halfmeta.htm

Metals
Spintronics